The Easts-Redlands District Cricket Club is a cricket club in Redlands, Queensland, Australia. They play in the Queensland Premier Cricket competition.

In 1897 the club was established as the Woolloongabba Cricket Club. In August 1925 a change of name to Eastern Suburbs was considered, and by September the club was playing as Eastern Suburbs. In 1995 it changed its name to East-Redlands.

List of First-class players
Below is a partial list of East-Redlands players who have played First-class cricket.
William Bradley
Edward Crouch
Lance Druery
William Hoare
Alex Kemp
Simon Milenko
Greg Moller
Marnus Labuschagne
Jimmy Peirson
James Bazley
Sam Heazlett

See also

References

External links
 
 

Queensland District Cricket clubs
Sporting clubs in Brisbane
1960 establishments in Australia
Cricket clubs established in 1960
Redland City